Luiz Gastão of Orléans-Braganza (19 February 19118 September 1931) was a member of the Brazilian Imperial Family, son of Prince Luiz of Orléans-Braganza and of his wife, Princess Maria di Grazia of Bourbon-Two Sicilies, on his father's side, he was the grandson of Princess Isabel and great-grandson of Emperor Pedro II of Brazil.

Life
Luiz Gastão was born at Cannes, France, the second son of Prince Luiz of Orléans-Braganza (1878–1920), and his wife, Princess Maria di Grazia of Bourbon-Two Sicilies (1878–1973). His father was the second son of Prince Gaston, Count of Eu, and Isabel, Princess Imperial of Brazil. His mother was the daughter of Prince Alfonso, Count of Caserta, and Princess Antonietta of Bourbon-Two Sicilies.

Luis Gastão's paternal grandmother, Isabel, Princess Imperial of Brazil, was the heir to the Brazilian throne. Her father Pedro II, was the last emperor of Brazil until he was deposed in 1889. Isabel's eldest son, Pedro de Alcântara, Prince of Grão-Pará, renounced his succession rights in 1908, passing the succession to his younger brother, Prince Luiz. When Prince Luiz died in 1920, his eldest son, and  Luiz Gastão's elder brother, Prince Pedro Henrique, became the Head of the Brazilian Imperial House, with Prince Luiz Gastão as his nominal heir.

Gastão died unmarried at an early age, and was buried in the Orléans Mausoleum in Dreux. After his death, his sister Princess Pia Maria became the titular heir of her brother Pedro Henrique, until the birth of Pedro Henrique's son, also called Prince Luiz, in 1938.

Ancestry

Notes and sources
Imperial House of Brazil (Portuguese)
The Royal House of Stuart, London, 1969, 1971, 1976, Addington, A. C., Reference: page 50.

|-

1911 births
1931 deaths
People from Cannes
Brazilian people of Italian descent
Brazilian people of Portuguese descent
Luis Gastao
Burials at the Chapelle royale de Dreux